Carlos Raúl Olses Quijada (born 5 September 2000) is a Venezuelan footballer who plays as a goalkeeper for Venezuelan Primera División side Deportivo La Guaira. Olses has been practicing the sport since he was a child and has now accomplished many goals that are admirable for his young age.

Club career
On January 28, 2018 Carlos debuted for Deportivo La Guaira in the Venezuelan Primera División. On 1 February 2019, Olses joined Argentine club Racing Club on a 18-months loan deal for a fee of 150.000 dollars with an option to make the move permanent for 650.000 dollars for 80% of the players rights.

International career
Olses, at first was called up to the Venezuela under-15 side for the 2015 South American Under-15 Football Championship, he started all the games Venezuela played in the tournament.

After that he was called up to the Venezuela under-17 side for the 2017 South American Under-17 Football Championship, and also starred all the games Venezuela played in the tournament.

Between August and September 2017, he was called up to play with the Venezuelan national selection "La Vinotinto" being named as the youngest player to be selected by this professional category in the Venezuelan Football Federation (FVF).

During the month of November 2017 he was called up to play in the 2017 "Juegos Bolivarianos" Under-20 Football Championship

Career statistics

Club

Personal life

Family and relationships
Carlos' parents are called Alejandro and Irene. He has two siblings; a brother, Alejandro, and a half-sister, Carola.

References

External links
Carlos Olses at Racing Club's website

2000 births
Living people
Venezuelan footballers
Venezuela youth international footballers
Venezuela under-20 international footballers
Association football goalkeepers
Venezuelan Primera División players
Deportivo La Guaira players
Racing Club de Avellaneda footballers
21st-century Venezuelan people